John Blair Robert Hastie (born 8 November 1932) is a former New Zealand cricket umpire. He stood in seven Test matches between 1974 and 1981 and four ODI games between 1975 and 1982.

Hastie umpired in two of the matches in one of the most acrimonious Test series of all, when the West Indians toured New Zealand in 1979–80. In the First Test at Carisbrook, Dunedin, after he turned down an appeal by Michael Holding for caught behind, Holding kicked two of the stumps out of the ground. During this Test, Hastie and his colleague Fred Goodall gave a Test record number of leg before wicket decisions: 12 – seven against the West Indies batsmen, five against New Zealand. New Zealand won by one wicket.

In all, Hastie umpired 48 first-class matches and 12 List A matches between January 1964 and March 1984, most of them at either Seddon Park, Hamilton, or Eden Park, Auckland.

See also
 List of Test cricket umpires
 List of One Day International cricket umpires

References

1932 births
Living people
People from Te Awamutu
New Zealand Test cricket umpires
New Zealand One Day International cricket umpires
Sportspeople from Waikato